Larotaxel (code names XRP9881,  RPR109881) is a drug of the taxane type that has been used experimentally in chemotherapy.

References

Mitotic inhibitors
Taxanes